A sofer is a ritual scribe in Judaism.

People with the surname Sofer, Sofaer or Sopher
 Sofer of Prague (Abraham Niederländer), 16th-century Jewish-Austrian mathematician
 Abraham Sofaer (1896–1988), British stage actor
 Abraham David Sofaer (born 1938), federal judge for the United States District Court
 Chaim Sofer (1821–1886), Hungarian rabbi
 Jekuthiel Sofer, 18th-century Jewish scribe from Amsterdam
 Moses Sofer (1762–1839), Orthodox rabbi also known by the name of his most famous work the Chatam Sofer
 Ofir Sofer, Israeli politician and minister (from Jan 2023)
 Rena Sofer (born 1968), American actress
 Avraham Shmuel Binyamin Sofer  (1815–1871), Hungarian rabbi also known as the Ktav Sofer
 Yaakov Chaim Sofer (1870–1939), Iraqi rabbi and author of Kaf HaChaim
 Yehoshua Sofer, Israeli martial artist
 Aaron Sopher (1905–1972), American artist

Other
 Rube John Sofer, a character played by Mandy Patinkin in the American television series Dead Like Me

See also
Soferet (disambiguation)

Jewish surnames